Varjoina kuljemme kuolleiden maassa ("As Shadows We Walk in the Land of the Dead") is the sixth full-length album by Finnish pagan metal band Moonsorrow. It was released on 21 February 2011 through Spinefarm Records.

Track listing

Personnel
 Ville Sorvali - vocals, bass, fretless bass
 Henri Sorvali - keyboards, guitars, mouth harp, accordion, vocals, choir, mandolin, bouzouki, recorder
 Marko Tarvonen - drums, percussion, guitars, vocals (backing), choir
 Mitja Harvilahti - saw, choir, guitars, vocals (backing), autoharp
 Markus Eurén - keyboards, vocals (backing), choir

Guest musicians
 Jukka Varmo - backing vocals
 Knut Sorvali - backing vocals
 Jules Näveri - backing vocals
 Olli Vänskä - violin, choirs
 Jakke Viitala - choirs
 Riku Katainen - backing vocals
 Mathias Lillmåns - backing vocals
 Janne Perttilä - choirs

Production
 Jukka Varmo - engineering
 Henri Urponpoika Sorvali - mixing
 Ahti Kortelainen - mixing
 Mika Jussila - mastering
 Jules Näveri - producer (vocals)
 Juha Helminen - photography
 Mikko Virtanen - layout

References

External links
 NoCleanSinging Review 
 Encyclopaedia Metallum

2011 albums
Moonsorrow albums
Spinefarm Records albums